Srishti is a 1976 Indian Malayalam film, directed by K. T. Muhammed. The film stars Chowalloor Krishnankutty, Ravi Alummoodu, Vijayan and Adoor Bhavani in the lead roles. The film has musical score by M. S. Baburaj.

Cast

Chowalloor Krishnankutty
Ravi Alummoodu
Vijayan 
Adoor Bhavani 
P. K. Vikraman Nair
Surasu 
Thrissur Elsy

Soundtrack
The music was composed by M. S. Baburaj and the lyrics were written by O. N. V. Kurup.

References

External links
 

1976 films
1970s Malayalam-language films